Aleksandr Romanovich Shchegolev (born 6 April 2002) is a Russian swimmer. He competed in the 2020 Summer Olympics.

References

External links
 
 
 
 

2002 births
Living people
Swimmers from Saint Petersburg
Swimmers at the 2020 Summer Olympics
Russian male swimmers
Olympic swimmers of Russia
European Aquatics Championships medalists in swimming
Medalists at the FINA World Swimming Championships (25 m)